Club Atlético Torino is a Peruvian football club, playing in the city of Talara.

The club were founded 1957 and play in the Peruvian Segunda División which is the second division of the Peruvian league.

History
The club was 1970, 1975, 1977, 1982, 1994 Copa Perú champion.

The club have played at the highest level of Peruvian football on nineteen occasions, since its first participation in 1970 Torneo Descentralizado to the 1997 Torneo Descentralizado.

In the 2008 Copa Perú, the club classified to the 2009 Segunda División Peruana as Copa Perú's third place.

Rivalries
Atlético Torino has had a long-standing rivalry with Atlético Grau.

Honours

National
Peruvian Primera División: 0
Runner-up (1): 1980

Copa Perú: 5
Winners (5): 1970, 1975, 1977, 1982, 1994

Regional
Región I:
Winners (1): 2008

Liga Departamental de Piura:
Winners (8): 1969, 1974, 1976, 1987, 1994, 2008, 2018, 2022
Runner-up (3): 1968, 2003, 2007

Liga Provincial de Talara:
Winners (4): 1976, 2003, 2007, 2008
Runner-up (2): 2018, 2022

Liga Distrital de Pariñas:
Winners (8): 1963, 1965, 1968, 1969, 1974, 2003, 2007, 2022
Runner-up (2): 2002, 2018

Performance in CONMEBOL competitions
Copa Libertadores: 1 appearance
1981: First Round

Kit and badge

Current Squad 2010

Notable players

See also
 List of football clubs in Peru
 Peruvian football league system

References

 
Association football clubs established in 1957
Football clubs in Peru